The 2012 Lamborghini Blanpain Super Trofeo season was the fourth season of the Lamborghini Super Trofeo. The season started on 14 April at Monza and ended in October at Navarra. The season featured six double-header rounds, with each race lasting for a duration of 50 minutes.

Super Trofeo Europe

Calendar

Entries

Results summary

Super Trofeo Asia

Calendar

Entries

Results summary

References

Lamborghini Super Trofeo
Lamborghini Super Trofeo seasons